Charlita is an Eastern Orthodox village in Koura District of Lebanon.

Eastern Orthodox Christian communities in Lebanon
Populated places in the North Governorate
Koura District